Taschagil, also known as Tasshagyl, (Tasşağyl, تاسشاعىل; , Tasshagil) is a town in Atyrau Region, west Kazakhstan.

References

Atyrau Region
Cities and towns in Kazakhstan